The 1999 Waterford Senior Hurling Championship was the 99th staging of the Waterford Senior Hurling Championship since its establishment by the Waterford County Board in 1897. The draw for the opening round fixtures took place in February 1999. The championship began on 16 July 1999 and ended on 19 September 1999.

Mount Sion were the defending champions. 

On 19 September 1999, Ballygunner won the championship after a 1-18 to 2-10 defeat of Mount Sion in the final at Walsh Park. It was their 8th championship title overall and their first title since 1997.

Ballygunner's Paul Flynn was the championship's top scorer with 3-30.

Results

First round

Relegation play-offs

Quarter-finals

Semi-finals

Final

Championship statistics

Top scorers

Top scorers overall

Top scorers in a single game

References

Waterford
Waterford Senior Hurling Championship